Noël Alexandre "Alex" Mendy  (born 14 December 1983 in Paris) is a French footballer who plays as a right back. 

He played formerly for FK Mladá Boleslav and helped them win the Czech Cup in 2011. He is known for his skill and pace.

Early career
Born in Paris, Mendy started his career at French club FC Versailles 78. Before trying his career in the Czech 1st Division in 2003 when he moved to FK Marila Příbram. The first club he played for in the Gambrinus Liga was FK Marila Příbram where he scored 6 league goals in 57 appearances before moving to FK Siad Most.

Mladá Boleslav
In 2007, he joined FK Mladá Boleslav on loan. Mendy made his European debut for Boleslaw against Palermo. In 2007, Mendy scored for Boleslav in the group stages of the UEFA Cup against Villarreal CF and IF Elfsborg, However they failed to qualify past the group stage after losing to AEK Athens and Fiorentina. Despite only scoring one goal in 24 league appearances, his move to FK Mladá Boleslav was made permanent in 2008.

During the 2010–11 season, Mendy played all 30 league games for FK Mladá Boleslav scoring six goals as he helped them finish in fifth place in the Gambrinus Liga and also win the Czech Cup for the first time in Boleslav's history after beating SK Sigma Olomouc on penalties, Mendy scored one of the penalties for Mladá Boleslav in the final. The Cup win also saw Boleslav qualify for the UEFA Europa League for the following season. After his contract with FK Mladá Boleslav expired in June 2011, Mendy sought pastures new and became a free agent. He has found the back of the net 24 times in 207 appearances in the Gambrinus Liga.

Leeds United trial
On 19 July 2011, he played as an unnamed trialist on the right wing for Leeds United during a friendly match against Rochdale along with fellow trialists Jlloyd Samuel and Isiah Osbourne. He played for Leeds in the friendly against Sheffield Wednesday where he was officially confirmed as the unnamed trialist by his real name. With Mendy impressing in his first two pre season games with Leeds his trial was extended even further for the match against Norwegian club Sandefjord Fotball. With Mendy again impressing, starting his third pre-season match in a row for Leeds.

Mendy again played for Leeds in their 3–2 win against Newcastle United at Elland Road, coming on as a second-half substitute where he impressed on the right wing. After the match manager Simon Grayson said he would make a decision whether to sign Mendy and fellow trialist Boldi Bodor in the next two days after saying he felt both trialists had done ok in their spells. On 4 August 2011, Grayson confirmed on Yorkshire Radio the club were looking into signing Mendy permanently, however the deal was taking time as there were complications. Grayson confirmed that he was looking to sign the player and send him out on loan to help him learn the English game.

With Leeds entering contract talks with Mendy, the move was called off on 11 August, after Leeds decided that they had to prioritise the transfer budget to sign players in other positions.

Chesterfield
On 17 August 2011, Mendy signed for Chesterfield on a 1-year deal until 30 June 2012.

Mendy scored his first goal for Chesterfield in the League Two 3–0 victory over Bournemouth on 10 September 2011. Mendy was part of the side that won the Football League Trophy in March 2012 at Wembley Stadium, it was his cross that set up the first goal for Chesterfield. He was released by the club at the end of the 2011–12 season.

Hansa Rostock
Mendy signed a two-year contract with German Club Hansa Rostock on 10 June 2012.

1.FC Saarbrücken
In 2014, he signed a contract with 1.FC Saarbrücken till 2016. He played with shirtnumber 4.

Personal life
Alexandre is the older brother of Vincent Mendy who plays as a defensive midfielder.

Honours
FK Mladá Boleslav
 2011 Czech Cup Winner
Chesterfield
 2012 Football League Trophy Winner

References

External links
 
 Chesterfield profile

1983 births
Living people
French footballers
French sportspeople of Senegalese descent
Footballers from Paris
Association football forwards
Czech First League players
FK Baník Most players
FK Mladá Boleslav players
FC Versailles 78 players
1. FK Příbram players
Chesterfield F.C. players
FC Hansa Rostock players
Expatriate footballers in the Czech Republic
3. Liga players
Regionalliga players
1. FC Saarbrücken players